Ahmet Nazif Zorlu (botn 28 August 1944 in Babadağ, Turkey) is a Turkish businessman, a billionaire and chairman of Zorlu Holding.

Biography

Zorlu began working in the business of his father Hacı Mehmet Zorlu, a textile factory. Ahmet Nazif Zorlu and his brother Zeki Zorlu expanded the business in 1960, by opening a store in Trabzon, and one in Istanbul later in 1966. Zorlu noted a gap in the textile market, and began producing patterned bed sheets under the TAÇ brand, and later produced the first king-sized bed sheets in Turkey.

In 2017, Zorlu was listed by Forbes as one of the richest men in Turkey, with an estimated US$1.3 billion fortune.

See also 
 List of Turkish billionaires by net worth
 Zorlu Holding

References 

1944 births
Living people
People from Babadağ, Denizli
Turkish billionaires
Turkish businesspeople